Alex Bugnon (born October 10, 1958) is a jazz pianist and composer from Montreux, Switzerland. He is a nephew of Donald Byrd.

Bugnon studied at the Paris Conservatory and the Mozart Academy in Salzburg. At age nineteen, he moved to the U.S. and attended the Berklee School of Music.

His recording career began with his 1988 debut studio album Love Season for Orpheus Records, which reached the Billboard 200 albums chart and the top 40 of the R&B/Hip-Hop Albums chart, as did his follow-up Head Over Heels.

Discography

References

External links
Official website
Alex Bugnon discography at Discogs

1958 births
Living people
Swiss jazz pianists
Smooth jazz pianists
Epic Records artists
Narada Productions artists
21st-century pianists
Berklee College of Music alumni